Geiger may refer to:

People 
Geiger (surname)

Places 
 Geiger, Alabama, a town
 Geiger (crater), a lunar impact crater on the far side of the Moon
 Geiger, South Sudan, a border town filled with refugees

Other 
 Geiger counter, a device for detecting radiation
 Geiger–Müller tube, the sensing element of the a Geiger counter
 Geiger–Marsden experiment, a 1909 physics experiment
 Geiger–Nuttall law, an empirical 1911 rule relating alpha decay energy to decay half-life
 Geiger tree (Cordia sebestena), a species of flowering plant 
 Geiger (corporation), a promotional products company
 Geiger (comics), a minor, teenage Marvel Comics super-heroine
 USNS Geiger, a transport ship in the United States Navy

See also 
 Giger (Swiss form)